Yasmin Mrabet (born 8 August 1999) is a Spanish-born Moroccan professional footballer who plays as a midfielder for Liga F club FC Levante Las Planas and as a centre-back for the Morocco women's national team.

Early life
Mrabet was born in Madrid to a Moroccan father and an English mother. She is fluent in Spanish, English, French and Catalan.

Club career 
Mrabet has played for Madrid CFF, Rayo Vallecano and Levante Las Planas in Spain.

As a teenager, Mrabet was a regular in the Madrid CFF side playing in the Liga Iberdrola and made over 50 appearances in the top-flight before leaving to join Rayo Vallecano in 2020. However, following a serious injury shortly after her arrival, her debut for her new club would only come in February 2021.

In the 2021-22 season, Mrabet scored eight goals in 27 appearances to help Levante Las Planas win the Reto Iberdrola title and earn promotion to the Liga F for the following season.

She continued to be a regular starter for the club on their return to the top-flight.

International career
Mrabet represented Spain at the 2018 UEFA Women's Under-19 Championship, winning a gold medal. She later switched allegiance to Morocco and made her senior debut on 30 November 2021 as a starter in a 2–0 friendly home win over Senegal. 

Mrabet was selected for the 2022 Women's Africa Cup of Nations in Morocco and, on 13 July 2022, she scored the winning goal in the quarterfinal match against Botswana which allowed Morocco to qualify for its first time ever to the FIFA Women's World Cup (2023 edition).

Her second goal for Morocco came at the 2023 Turkish Women's Cup in a 3-0 victory over Slovakia.

Honours 
Spain

 UEFA Women's Under-19 Championship: 2018

Morocco

 Africa Women Cup of Nations: runner-up 2022

Levante Las Planas

 Reto Iberdrola: 2021-22

Career Statistics

Club

See also
List of Morocco women's international footballers

Notes

References

External links 
Yasmin Mrabet at BDFutbol

1999 births
Living people
Citizens of Morocco through descent
Moroccan women's footballers
Women's association football midfielders
Morocco women's international footballers
Moroccan people of English descent
Footballers from Madrid
Spanish women's footballers
Madrid CFF players
Rayo Vallecano Femenino players
FC Levante Las Planas players
Primera División (women) players
Segunda Federación (women) players
Spain women's youth international footballers
Spanish sportspeople of Moroccan descent
Spanish people of English descent